Romeo and Juliet is a lost 1916 American silent film based on William Shakespeare's play, Romeo and Juliet. John W. Noble is credited as director  and Francis X. Bushman and Beverly Bayne star as the lovers. This film was produced in 1916, the 300th anniversary of Shakespeare's death, and was released amongst many other commemorations of his works.

This film was produced and released in direct competition with another film, Romeo and Juliet produced by William Fox, starring Theda Bara, and released three days later. Bushman later claimed, in an interview, that he went to see the Theda Bara version and was shocked to see that Fox had added some intertitles from the Metro version.

Plot summary

Cast
 Francis X. Bushman as Romeo
 Beverly Bayne as Juliet
 Horace Vinton as Escalus, Prince of Verona
 John Davidson as Paris
 Eric Hudson as Montague
 Edmund Elton as Capulet
 Leonard Grover as Old Man
 Fritz Leiber, Sr. as Mercutio
 Olav Skavlan as Benvolio
 Lawson Butt as Tybalt
 Robert Cummings as Friar Laurence
 A. J. Herbert as Friar John
 Edwin Boring as Balthasar
 William Morris as Abraham
 Joseph Dailey as Peter

References

External links

 
 
 
 
  Bushman as Romeo on the front cover of Motion Picture Magazine

1916 films
American silent feature films
American films based on plays
Lost American films
1916 romantic drama films
American romantic drama films
American black-and-white films
Films based on Romeo and Juliet
Films directed by John W. Noble
1910s American films
Silent romantic drama films
Silent horror films
Silent American drama films